James West was the second full-time secretary and de facto manager of football club Newton Heath, the precursor to Manchester United (the term "manager" was not in common usage at the club until the arrival of Jack Robson in 1914).

Career
West oversaw Newton Heath's financial collapse and near bankruptcy, followed by the club's rebirth as Manchester United on 28 April 1902.

References
Notes

Bibliography

English football managers
Lincoln City F.C. managers
Manchester United F.C. managers
Year of birth missing
Year of death missing